is a Japanese former heavyweight karateka, kickboxer, professional wrestler and mixed martial artist. He is one of the pioneering heavyweight fighters in K-1, having been a member of Kazuyoshi Ishii's Seidokaikan school.

Early life and karate career
Satake began practicing karate after being inspired by the publications of Mas Oyama in junior high school. After graduating from Kansai University with a major in English, he turned down a job at a television studio in order to practice martial arts full-time. Within three years, he was fighting professionally at the national level, placing fourth in the 3rd All Japan Karate Championships of 1984. Half a decade later, he was regularly placing first in Japan's largest tournaments and ranked among the country's most successful karateka.

During October 2–3, 1993, Satake participated in his final karate tournament to date - the K-1 Illusion 1993 Karate World Cup. After defeating Patrick Smith and Adam Watt on the first day and Taiei Kin on the second, he met fellow karate superstar Andy Hug in the finals. When judges were unable to determine a winner, four additional overtime rounds were called, but a decisive winner still couldn't be named. The match went to sudden death via a tameshiwari content, wherein Satake bested his Swiss opponent to become world champion.

Kickboxing career
Satake made his kickboxing debut against WKA US Cruiserweight Champion Don Nakaya Nielsen. Nielsen placed his opponent on the defensive in the opening moments, but Satake fought back with repeated headbutts that led to a foul being ruled. Nielsen subsequently dropped his guard, allowing Satake to land a left hook too strong for Nielsen to recover from. Despite taking a two-year break from kickboxing afterwards to focus on karate, Satake followed his initial victory up with an undefeated streak that included draws against world champions Rob Kaman and Peter Aerts - establishing himself as a Japanese powerhouse who could hold his own against the best of international competition.

K-1
Based on his initial kickboxing record, his status as one of Japan's top karate competitors, and his affiliation with K-1 founder Kazuyoshi Ishii's Seidokaikan group, Satake was invited to participate in the first K-1 event - K-1 Sanctuary I. Following a victory over American Chris Blanner, he was invited to the company's first-ever world tournament, the K-1 Grand Prix '93. He bested future Olympic bobsledder Todd Hays in the quarterfinals before suffering his first defeat (and knockout) to Branko Cikatić, who would go on to win the tournament.
Despite this loss, Satake rebounded by winning his first world title – the vacant UKF World Heavyweight Championship – from his old rival Don Nakaya Nielsen. He next defeated Stan Longinidis in a title-versus-title match, but Longinidis retained his WKA World Super Heavyweight Championship after arguing that the match was not conducted under WKA rules. Satake made up for this denial by winning the KICK World Super Heavyweight and ISKA World Heavyweight Championships in a match against American Jeff Hollins at the K-2 Grand Prix '93.

Despite suffering a loss to future K-1 megastar Ernesto Hoost at K-1 Challenge, Satake was invited to the second world tournament, the K-1 Grand Prix '94. After defeating karate champ Michael Thompson in the quarterfinals, he avenged his previous year's loss to Branko Cikatić with a decision victory over the Croatian Tiger. Satake moved on to arguably the most important match of his career: the World Grand Prix final against Peter Aerts. Despite throwing no shortage of powerful strikes at the Dutchman, Satake was unable to land many significant blows while enduring several from Aerts, and lost by unanimous decision. It was the last time Satake reached the finals of a WGP tournament.

Again, Satake rebounded from his grand prix loss with a world title win, this time securing the WKA World Muay Thai Super Heavyweight Championship in a match with Dennis Lane at K-1 Revenge. However, he lost it less than three months later to Sam Greco. It was the last world title he ever held. He entered and won two Japanese qualifying tournaments – the K-1 Dream '97 Japan Grand Prix and the K-1 Japan Grand Prix '98 – and though these accomplishments helped lead him to the WGP three more times, he did not advance beyond the semifinals. Though his wins always outnumbered his defeats, his achievements over world champion-level opponents dwindled, as he achieved little more than a 1997 decision victory over WKA World Muay Thai Champion Kirkwood Walker and a draw with hall-of-famer Maurice Smith.

On October 3, 1999, Satake attempted to qualify for the WGP one more time in a match against Musashi. Musashi defeated him by unanimous decision. Satake, who later described his opponent as "shameful" and a "bad student," disagreed with the outcome. In addition to this, his ongoing disenchantment with Kazuyoshi Ishii moved him to retire from K-1 and kickboxing in general.

At the time of his retirement, Satake was the most successful Japanese fighter active in the heavyweight division. He was a four-time world champion, a winner of two regional tournaments, and is one of only 18 competitors to have reached the WGP finals.

Professional wrestling

Fighting Network RINGS (1991–1992)
Satake debuted in professional wrestling in the shoot-style promotion Fighting Network RINGS. Wearing the style's signature tights and knee boots, he fought to a draw against Hans Nijman in his first match. He went on to face Gerard Gordeau in his second bout, but the match descended into chaos when Gordeau – after being kicked in the back by Satake while facing away – began shooting on Satake with punches and knees, resulting in a brawl. Satake also had matches against Willie Peeters, Herman Renting and Maurice Smith.

He participated in the Mega Battle Tournament 1992, eliminating Mitsuya Nagai in the first round but retiring prematurely due to an injury sustained in training.

WRESTLE-1 (2002–2003)
In 2002 and 2003, Satake appeared in the first WRESTLE-1 event, promoted by All Japan Pro Wrestling and K-1. Performing under the ring name “SATA...yarn” and wearing military garments, he wrestled Abdullah the Butcher twice, being defeated both times.

Mixed martial arts career

Pride
Satake made the transition to mixed martial arts with Pride Fighting Championships in 2000. At 34 years old, Satake was considered too old to perform adequately but sought to defy critics by joining the Takada Dojo, training under Kazushi Sakuraba. He was selected to participate in the Pride Grand Prix 2000, for which he tried to set up a match with Naoya Ogawa by trash-talking the world judo champion. Instead, he was instead pitted against UFC veteran and eventual tournament winner Mark Coleman. Masaaki lost the fight, being taken down easily by the American wrestler and submitted via neck crank.

His second fight was a non-tournament bout against former Pancrase fighter Guy Mezger. Satake successfully resisted Mezger's repeated takedown attempts during the first round but was taken down and controlled during the second for a unanimous decision loss.

At Pride 10, Satake earned his first victory over professional wrestler and judo specialist Kazunari Murakami. During the match, Murakami took down and mounted Satake, but the karate champion resisted. Satake eventually fell on top of Murakami during a scramble and applied ground and pound until a doctor stoppage. After the match, Murakami's teammate Naoya Ogawa appeared and traded heated words with Satake.

Despite talks for a possible match with Ogawa, no contest initially materialized due to Ogawa's scheduled match against Rickson Gracie. However, Ogawa eventually accepted a fight against Satake, which took place at Pride 11. Satake marked his opponent's leg with low kicks, but the judo champion managed to get Masaaki on the ground and submit him via rear naked choke in the second round.

At Pride 13, Satake was pitted against retired sumo and professional wrestler Tadao Yasuda. Heavily outweighed, Satake was repeatedly driven against the ropes by his adversary, impeding him from landing solid strikes and resulting in an eventual unanimous decision loss. For the rest of 2001, Satake would fight notable strikers like Igor Vovchanchyn, Semmy Schilt and Sam Greco – losing to the former two and drawing with the third.

In 2002, Masaaki fought Quinton “Rampage” Jackson at Pride 20. The fight started slowly, but Jackson walked through Satake's punches and performed a powerslam, followed by multiples knees and punches from dominant positions. Satake eventually managed to stand, only for Jackson to grab his waist and execute a German suplex, making Satake land on his head. The fight was immediately ruled a TKO win for Rampage while Satake was rushed to the hospital, where a cracked skull and a gravely injured neck were diagnosed.

Satake's final fight was a bout against judo gold medalist Hidehiko Yoshida at Inoki Bom-Ba-Ye 2000, during which he fell to a guillotine choke.

Later career
After his retirement from combat sports, Satake opened the Satake Dojo karate school in Kyoto City. In 2007, he founded the Heisi Bushido school for human resource management and training and development.

In 2013, Satake was approved by the Liberal Democratic Party of Japan and received a candidacy for the 23rd House of Councilors regular election. Despite general LDP victory, Satake was not elected.

Titles
Kickboxing
 K-1
 K-1 Japan Grand Prix '98 Champion
 K-1 Dream '97 Champion
 K-1 Grand Prix '94 Runner-up
 World Kickboxing Association
 1994 WKA World Muay Thai Super Heavyweight Champion
 International Sport Karate Association
 1993 ISKA World Oriental Rules Heavyweight Champion
 Karate International Council of Kickboxing 
 1993 KICK World Super Heavyweight Champion
 Universal Kickboxing Federation
 1993 UKF World Heavyweight Champion

Karate
 K-1 Illusion 1993 Karate World Cup Champion
 1993 2nd Towa Cup Japan Open Tournament – 1st place
 1992 1st Towa Cup Japan Open Tournament – 1st place
 1990 9th All Japan Karate Championships – 3rd place
 1989 Karate Real Tournament – 1st place
 1989 Japan Martial Arts Festival Tournament – 1st place
 1989 8th All Japan Karate Championships – 1st place
 1988 8th Shidokan Open Tournament – 1st place
 1988 7th All Japan Karate Championships – 1st place
 1988 Karate Real Tournament – Runner-up
 1987 6th All Japan Karate Championships – 1st place
 1986 5th All Japan Karate Championships – Runner-up
 1985 4th All Japan Karate Championships – Runner-up
 1984 3rd All Japan Karate Championships – 4th place

Kickboxing record

Mixed rules

Mixed martial arts record

|-
| Loss
| align=center | 1-8-1
| Hidehiko Yoshida
| Submission (neck crank)
| Inoki Bom-Ba-Ye 2002
| 
| align=center | 1
| align=center | 0:50
| Saitama, Saitama, Japan
|
|-
| Loss
| align=center | 1-7-1
| Quinton Jackson
| TKO (slam)
| Pride 20
| 
| align=center | 1
| align=center | 7:18
| Yokohama, Kanagawa, Japan
|
|-
| Draw
| align=center | 1-6-1
| Sam Greco
| Draw
| Inoki Bom-Ba-Ye 2001
| 
| align=center | 5
| align=center | 3:00
| Saitama, Saitama, Japan
|
|-
| Loss
| align=center | 1-6
| Semmy Schilt
| TKO (strikes)
| Pride 17
| 
| align=center | 1
| align=center | 2:18
| Tokyo, Japan
|
|-
| Loss
| align=center | 1-5
| Igor Vovchanchyn
| Decision (unanimous)
| Pride 15
| 
| align=center | 3
| align=center | 5:00
| Saitama, Saitama, Japan
|
|-
| Loss
| align=center | 1-4
| Tadao Yasuda
| Decision (split)
| Pride 13 - Collision Course
| 
| align=center | 3
| align=center | 5:00
| Saitama, Saitama, Japan
|
|-
| Loss
| align=center | 1-3
| Naoya Ogawa
| Submission (rear-naked choke)
| Pride 11 - Battle of the Rising Sun
| 
| align=center | 2
| align=center | 2:01
| Osaka, Japan
|
|-
| Win
| align=center | 1-2
| Kazunari Murakami
| TKO (punches)
| Pride 10 - Return of the Warriors
| 
| align=center | 1
| align=center | 6:58
| Saitama, Saitama, Japan
|
|-
| Loss
| align=center | 0-2
| Guy Mezger
| Decision (unanimous)
| Pride Grand Prix 2000 Finals
| 
| align=center | 1
| align=center | 15:00
| Tokyo, Japan
|
|-
| Loss
| align=center | 0-1
| Mark Coleman
| Submission (neck crank)
| Pride Grand Prix 2000 Opening Round
| 
| align=center | 1
| align=center | 1:14
| Tokyo, Japan
|

Mixed rules 

| Win
| align=center | 1-0
| Mitsuya Nagai
| KO (palm strike)
| Rings: Mega Battle Tournament 1992 First Round
| 
| align=center | 1
| align=center | 1:24
| Nagoya, Japan
|
|-

Karate record

Filmography

Films

Television

Bibliography

See also
List of K-1 events
List of K-1 champions
List of male kickboxers

References

External links
Profile at K-1

Japanese male kickboxers
Heavyweight kickboxers
Japanese male mixed martial artists
Heavyweight mixed martial artists
Japanese male karateka
Mixed martial artists utilizing Seidokaikan
Mixed martial artists utilizing wrestling
1965 births
Living people
People from Suita
Place of birth missing (living people)